The following is a list of presidents of the Landtag of Thuringia.

President of the Beratende Landesversammlung

Presidents of the Landtag of Thuringia

Landtag,Presidents
Lists of legislative speakers in Germany